The 1964–65 Detroit Red Wings season saw the Red Wings finish in first place in the National Hockey League (NHL) with a record of 40 wins, 23 losses, and 7 draws. They lost in the first round of the playoffs to the Chicago Black Hawks in seven games.

Detroit goaltender Roger Crozier won the Calder Memorial Trophy as the league's Rookie of the Year. He was also named an NHL First Team All-Star, along with centreman Norm Ullman. Defenseman Bill Gadsby and right winger Gordie Howe were named NHL Second Team All-Stars this season.

Offseason

Regular season

Final standings

Record vs. opponents

Schedule and results

Playoffs

Player statistics

Regular season
Scoring

Goaltending

Playoffs
Scoring

Goaltending

Note: GP = Games played; G = Goals; A = Assists; Pts = Points; +/- = Plus-minus PIM = Penalty minutes; PPG = Power-play goals; SHG = Short-handed goals; GWG = Game-winning goals;
      MIN = Minutes played; W = Wins; L = Losses; T = Ties; GA = Goals against; GAA = Goals-against average;  SO = Shutouts;

Awards and records
Calder Memorial Trophy: Roger Crozier
Roger Crozier, Goaltender, NHL First Team All-Star
Norm Ullman, Centre, NHL First Team All-Star
Bill Gadsby, Defence, NHL Second Team All-Star
Gordie Howe, Right Wing, NHL Second Team All-Star

Transactions

Draft picks
Detroit's draft picks at the 1964 NHL Entry Draft held at the Queen Elizabeth Hotel in Montreal, Quebec.

Farm teams

See also
1964–65 NHL season

References

External links

Detroit
Detroit
Detroit Red Wings seasons
Detroit Red Wings
Detroit Red Wings